William Welsh (November 22, 1822 – June 22, 1905) was a merchant, ship owner and politician in Prince Edward Island. He represented Queen's County in the House of Commons of Canada from 1887 to 1896 as an Independent Liberal and then Liberal member. Welsh represented 4th Queens in the Legislative Assembly of Prince Edward Island from 1873 to 1878 as a Liberal member.

He was born on Prince Edward Island, the son of Charles Welsh, and educated in Charlottetown. In 1854, he married Maria J. Pethick. He was a justice of the peace and served in the local militia, reaching the rank of major. He was first elected to the provincial assembly in an 1873 by-election held after David Laird was elected to the House of Commons. He ran unsuccessfully for a federal seat in 1876 and 1884. Welsh was defeated in a bid for reelection in East Queen's in 1896.

External links 
 
The Canadian parliamentary companion, 1889 JA Gemmill

1822 births
1905 deaths
People from Queens County, Prince Edward Island
Members of the House of Commons of Canada from Prince Edward Island
Liberal Party of Canada MPs
Prince Edward Island Liberal Party MLAs
Canadian justices of the peace